Yaman is a 2017 Indian Tamil-language political action thriller film written and directed by Jeeva Shankar. Co-produced by Lyca Productions and Vijay Antony Film Corporation, the film stars Vijay Antony and Miya, while Thiagarajan portrays another pivotal character. The film, which features Jeeva Shankar and Vijay Antony doubling up as the cinematographer and the music composer respectively, was released. The movie was a commercial success.

Plot 
As the film begins, in the mid 1980s Thriunelveli, Arivudai Nambi is killed by his rivals, who fear that their position would be threatened if he were to make it big in politics. Arividuai Nambi's wife commits suicide after the sudden death of her husband. Eventually, Arivudai Nambi's father looked after and cared for his grandson.

Decades later, Arivudai Nambi's son Tamilarasan is accidentally drawn into the murky world of behind-the-screens politicking when he is jailed due to admitting to having hit someone on the road. Two gangster-type baddies with political backing become his enemies, and this, in turn, brings him closer to Karunakaran, a political heavyweight who has his own ambitions.

A minister sees Tamilarasan as an enemy because he sees him as Nambi, whom he had conspired to murder and later killed. Meanwhile, Tamailarasan had a friendly relationship with Anjana after she accidentally hit him on his motorbike. Machinations and counter-machinations grow with the growing political ambitions of Tamilarasan, whose rivals will not let him and his wife, Anjana, live in peace. Tamilarasan boldly faces all this in his game of one-upmanship and realizes his dream of growing big in politics, like his father.

Cast

Production
In December 2015, Jeeva Shankar announced that his next film would feature Vijay Antony and the pair would collaborate after working together in Naan (2012). Shankar had initially discussed the script with other actors including Vijay Sethupathi, who had requested the director to finish the script in two months, but Shankar took eight months and Vijay Sethupathi became busy with other projects. Antony's availability meant that Shankar chose to cast him in the lead role. He revealed that the film would be a political thriller film set in Chennai and Antony would portray the character who brings "the message of death". Miya was signed on as the film's lead actress during January 2016, while Lyca Productions announced that they would produce the film. Antony put on weight for the film and began working on the project during the same month, with the producers revealing that the film would be shot within eighty days. Thiagarajan joined the film's cast during May 2016 and revealed that he would portray the lead antagonist, appearing as a "political mastermind".

Several scenes were shot in Chennai, while a prison set was erected in Pondicherry for the shoot. A song was shot in Mumbai during July 2016 featuring Vijay Antony and Miya. The team later moved on to film sequences in Georgia during July 2016.

Soundtrack

The film's score and soundtrack were composed by Vijay Antony. The song "Yem Mela Kai Vachaa Gaali" was released as a single in September 2016, during the Tamil Nadu Premier League match of Kovai vs Chepauk held in Tirunelveli. The album was released on 4 February 2017 by Lyca Music.

Release
The film had a worldwide theatrical release on 24 February 2017. The satellite rights of the film were sold to Zee Tamil. Sify.com gave the film a positive review, stating "to conclude, Yaman is a film with many layers, and one with solid drama at its core, which makes it such an engaging watch" and that "it is that rare kind of film which transports you bang in the middle of its action". In their review of the film, The Hindu found "strong performances and detailing save the day for Vijay Antony's Yaman... the film's release timing is apt in the country's politically active scenario". A critic from The Times of India wrote "overall, a little more pace, doing away a duet song which appears in the second half which makes audience yawn and slight tone down of heroism would have worked wonders". The Indian Express called it "a watchable political drama, which has come out at the right time in the light of the ongoing political crisis in Tamil Nadu". Likewise, The Deccan Chronicles review mentioned, "the film works only in parts". The New Indian Express stated "despite the glitches, and with more positives than negatives, Yaman is a fairly interesting watch". Baradwaj Rangan of Film Companion wrote "There's too much dialogue, explaining what we already know. And Vijay Antony isn't actor enough to clue us in to the character's inner workings...To his credit, he wants to veer away from the mass-hero template. His films actually have a story. If only he'd find better people to tell them."

References

External links
 

2017 films
2010s Tamil-language films
Films scored by Vijay Antony
Indian action thriller films
2010s political thriller films
Political action films
Films shot in Georgia (country)
Films shot in Chennai
Films shot in Puducherry
Indian political thriller films
2017 action thriller films